Matthew William Hill (June 26, 1894 – February 28, 1989) was an American lawyer who served as a justice of the Washington Supreme Court from 1947 to 1969, and chief justice from 1957 to 1959.

Early life and education
Matthew Hill was born in Bozeman, Montana, the only child of Saxton Hill and Mary Elma Noe. In 1907, when Matthew was 13 years old, the family moved to Lester, Washington. He attended a two-room school, later being graduated from Stadium High School, Tacoma. He enrolled in the University of Washington where he was a member of the debating team, and Vice-President of the University of Washington Associated Students. In 1917, he graduated cum laude and Order of the Coif with a Bachelors of Law degree. He later received an honorary Juris Doctor from Seattle Pacific College.

Legal career

Admitted to the Bar in 1918, Hill practiced law in Seattle. From 1923 to 1924, he served as an Assistant U.S. District Attorney. He was appointed judge of the King County Superior Court in 1945. In 1946, he was elected as a justice of the Supreme Court of Washington State, defeating incumbent Edward M. Connelly, taking office on January 13, 1947, and served as chief justice from January 14, 1957 to January 12, 1958.

Honors
The Matthew W. Hill Scholarship at the University of Washington Law School, established in his memory, supports second and third year students.

Personal life

In May 1924, Hill married Irma Verne Young and they had two daughters (Irma L. and Mary B. Hill) and a son (Matthew Hale Hill). Hill died in Olympia at the age of 94.

References

Selected publications

Court opinions written by Matthew W. Hill. CourtListener.com.

1894 births
1989 deaths
Justices of the Washington Supreme Court
University of Washington School of Law alumni
20th-century American judges
People from Bozeman, Montana
People from Olympia, Washington